The Petit Minou Lighthouse is a lighthouse in the roadstead of Brest, standing in front of the Fort du Petit Minou, in the commune of Plouzané. By aligning it with the Phare du Portzic, it shows the safe route to follow for ships to enter the roadstead. It also has a red signal that indicates a dangerous sector around the plateau of les Fillettes (literally "the girls"), one of the submerged rocks in the Goulet de Brest — sailors remember this by using the mnemonic "Le Minou rougit quand il couvre les Fillettes" ("the Minou blushes when he covers the girls").

Built between 1694 and 1697, the Fort du Petit Minou was a fort built in the commune of Plouzané in France to defend the goulet de Brest.

As part of the massive fortification campaign of France under the direction of the Marquis de Vauban, construction on the Fort du Petit Minou bastion was finished in 1697. Two hundred and forty cannons and a formidable moat helped protect a waterway leading to the military port town of Brest, on France's northwest coast. The waters offshore are notoriously treacherous, so in 1848, the Phare (lighthouse) du Petit Minou was added in front of the fort to aid navigation through the Goulet de Brest strait. It's one of dozens of lighthouses dotting the craggy, and infamously stormy, Brittany shores.

See also 

 List of lighthouses in France

References

External links 
 
 
 

Lighthouses completed in 1848
Petit Minou
Buildings and structures in Brest, France
Tourist attractions in Finistère
Round towers